Kingdon is a surname. Notable people with the surname include:

John Abernethy Kingdon (1828–1906), English historian and surgeon
Tully Kingdon (1835–1907), English Anglican bishop
William Kingdon Clifford FRS (1845–1879), English mathematician and philosopher
Edith Kingdon (1864–1921), American actress
Frank Kingdon-Ward (1885–1958), English botanist, explorer, plant collector and author
Frank Kingdon (1894–1972), American activist and educator
Billy Kingdon (1907–1977), English footballer
Edith Kingdon Gould (1920–2004), American socialite, linguist, actress, and poet
Guy Kingdon Natusch (born 1921), New Zealand architect
Jonathan Kingdon (born 1935), Tanzanian-British zoologist
John W. Kingdon (born 1940), American political scientist
Francesca Kingdon, British actress
Mark D. Kingdon, American chief executive officer
Mark E. Kingdon, American hedge fund manager
Kingdon Gould disambiguation page

See also
Kingdon trap, type of ion trap